Charles Augustus Hawley (March 13, 1861 – July 22, 1929) was an American orthodontist who is known for developing the Hawley retainer which is used in the field of Orthodontics. He attended Angle School of Orthodontia and graduated from there in 1905.

Life
He was born in Avery, Ohio in 1861. He attended high school in Columbus, Ohio and then attended Ohio State University for his college degree. He then attended University of Michigan School of Dentistry and obtained his degree in 1893. He then became the Professor of Operative faculty soon after his graduation from the school. He is known to be one of the first people to have used nitrous oxide as an anesthetic for the removal of teeth. He attended Angle School of Orthodontia and graduated in 1905. He moved to Washington, D.C. after and became the first person to specialize in Orthodontics in that city.

He was married to Evelyn Frank Hawley.

Career
In the field of Orthodontics, he is best known for his introduction of a refined type of retention plate called the Hawley Bite Plate. Two of Dr. Hawley's papers Determination of the Normal Arch and Its Application to Orthodontia and An Accurate Method in Orthodontia were read before 4th International Dental Congress and New York Institute of Stomatology. These papers were direct results of Dr. Hawley's work.

Positions held
 American Society of Orthodontists, President, 1908
 New York Society of Orthodontists, President, 1929
 Southern Society of Orthodontist, President-Elect
 District of Columbia Dental Society, President
 American College of Dentists, Fellow

References

American dentists
Orthodontists
1861 births
1929 deaths
University of Michigan School of Dentistry alumni
Ohio State University alumni